The Silverstone 24 Hour was a sports car race in endurance racing, held annually at Silverstone Circuit in the United Kingdom until 2018.

The race was originally organised by Britcar.  The 2009 race was shortened to 500 miles due to the recession. In the 2010 race it was the first time they used the new Arena Circuit, previously they used the Bridge Grand Prix Circuit. The 2013 edition was shortened to 1000 km. For 2015 the race was called the Dunlop 24hr at Silverstone for sponsorship reasons.

On October 2, 2015 Creventic, the promoter and organiser of the 24H Series and the Touring Car Endurance Series, announced they would organise the Silverstone 24-Hour race in 2016. It was the third round of the 2016 24H Series season and the first round of the 2016 Touring Car Endurance Series season. Every round of the 24H Series can be entered with a GT car, but this race is only open to non-GT cars.

Winners

Participants
Many big name teams have taken part in the race such as Rollcentre Racing, Jet Alliance Motorsport and Duller Motorsport. As of the end of the 2016 race, Duller Motorsport and Rollcentre Racing are the only teams that have won this event more than once.

Factory effort teams have also attempted it such as Ginetta, Mazda and Nissan.

In 2007, Top Gear took part in this race using a diesel BMW 3 series for a Top Gear Challenge. They finished the race, third in class, ahead of one of their rival teams who were also competing with a diesel BMW 3 Series.

In 2012, a team of ex-servicemen took part under the Mission Motorsport banner in a Nissan 370Z. They finished in 17th overall, scoring a top ten class result.

In 2015, the Ginetta Nissan LMP3 took its debut 24 hour race start with the factory Team LNT squad. Among the driver roster was six-time Olympic champion Sir Chris Hoy. 2015 also marked the first year for a female scoring outright victory; Jamie Chadwick aboard the #35 Beechdean Aston Martin.

Since 2016, the race is restricted to touring cars and 24H-Specials.

See also
Willhire 24 Hour
24H Series
Touring Car Endurance Series

References

2005 establishments in England
2018 disestablishments in England
Sports car races
Touring car races
Endurance motor racing
Recurring sporting events established in 2005
Recurring events disestablished in 2018
Auto races in the United Kingdom
24H Series